Taka is a Japanese given name. People with the name include:
 Taka Aono,  racecar driver
 Taka-Arashi, A sumo wrestler from Virtua Fighter
 Taka Hirose (born 1967), bassist of the rock band Feeder
 Taka Kato (born 1959), pornographic film actor
 Taka Michinoku (born 1973), wrestler
 Taka as the stage name of Takahiro Moriuchi (born 1988), rock singer of One Ok Rock.
 Taka as the stage name of Takahiro Suzuki (born 1976), member of the comedian duo Taka and Toshi.

Fictional Characters  
 Taka Silasakti Subrata, a HR manager of a fictional Indonesian Television station OKTV from situation comedy OB.
Taka Kamitani (狼谷 鷹), a character from the manga and anime School Babysitters and the younger brother of Hayato Kamitani

See also 
 
 Taka (disambiguation)

Japanese masculine given names